The Greater Montréal Real Estate Board (GMREB), or Chambre immobilière du Grand Montréal in French, is the second largest real estate board in Canada.

History
Created in 1954, GMREB is a not-for-profit association that represents almost all of the 10,000 real estate brokers in the Montréal Metropolitan Area. It is the second largest real estate board in Canada and one of the 20 largest boards in North America.

GMREB plays a role in representing its members among government authorities, the media, the public and various industry-related associations. It issues press releases on  real estate topics, as well as monthly statistics for the real estate market.

In 2013, GMREB voted to break away from the Canadian Real Estate Association, and removed all listings from their national website, Realtor.ca.
However, as of November 2018, CREA displays real estate listings from Montreal on their website.

References

External links
Greater Montréal Real Estate Board
Québec Federation of Real Estate Boards
Number One Real Estate Agent in Montreal

Montreal
Organizations based in Montreal
Economy of Montreal
Trade associations based in Quebec